Arthur Dignam (9 September 1939 – 9 May 2020) was an Australian stage and screen actor.

Biography
Dignam was born on Lord Howe Island. He attended Newington College in Sydney as a boarder in 1955 and 1956 and then the University of Sydney.

He has been best known for one of his early roles, that of Brother Francine in Fred Schepisi's The Devil's Playground (1976).  While he has worked mainly in film and television, he also worked in theatre, including musical theatre. He played Pontius Pilate in the Australian production of Jesus Christ Superstar in 1972–73, and appears on the original Australian cast recording.

During 1980, Dignam was part of A Shakespeare Company, funded by a one-off grant from the Australia Council, and worked with actors Ruth Cracknell, Ron Haddrick and others on two texts for six months and then presented them at the Seymour Centre.

Dignam died on 9 May 2020, at the age of 80.

Family
His son is actor Nicholas Gledhill.

Theatre credits
The Women of Troy, Merlyn Theatre, Southbank, VIC, 6 November 2008
The Women of Troy, Wharf 1, Sydney, NSW, 16 September 2008
Julius Caesar, Wharf 1, Sydney, NSW, 28 June 2005
The Governor's Family, Belvoir St Theatre Surry Hills, NSW, 1 May 1997
Sixteen Words for Water, Subiaco Theatre Centre, Subiaco, WA, 27 July 1994
Mesmerized, Stables Theatre, Darlinghurst, NSW, 8 April 1993
Life of Galileo, Nimrod Upstairs, Surry Hills, NSW, 27 June 1979
Hedda Gabler, SGIO Theatre, Brisbane, QLD, 18 April 1979
Pandora's Cross, Paris Theatre, Sydney, NSW, 29 July 1978
Ned Kelly, Her Majesty's Theatre (1960-2001), Sydney, NSW, 4 February 1978
Ned Kelly, Festival Theatre, Adelaide, SA, 30 December 1977
Big Toys, Parade Theatre, Kensington, NSW, 27 July 1977
Waiting For Godot, Octagon Theatre, Crawley, WA, 13 November 1975
Scapin, Recording Hall, Sydney, NSW, 7 March 1975
Berenice, Recording Hall, Sydney, NSW, 1975
The Rocky Horror Show, New Art Cinema, Glebe, NSW, 19 April 1974
The Threepenny Opera, Drama Theatre, Sydney, NSW, 25 September 1973
Kabul, Parade Theatre, Kensington, NSW, 31 May 1973
Hamlet, Nimrod Street Theatre, Darlinghurst, NSW, 23 March 1973
Julius Caesar, Sir John Clancy Auditorium, Kensington, NSW, 28 June 1972
The Good Man of Setzuan, Parade Theatre, Kensington, NSW, 14 April 1972
Trelawny of the Wells, Parade Theatre, Kensington, NSW, 28 January 1972
An Evening of Victorian Music Hall, Paddington Town Hall (No 2 Hall), Paddington, NSW, 26 March 1971
Doctor Faustus, Southern Highlands Festival Theatre, Mittagong, NSW, 23 February 1971
The Recruiting Officer, Southern Highlands Festival Theatre, Mittagong, NSW, 5 February 1971
Macbeth, Nimrod Street Theatre, Darlinghurst, NSW, 1971
Hadrian VII, Octagon Theatre, Crawley, WA, 25 September 1970
You Can't Take It with You, The Hole in the Wall Theatre, Leederville, WA, 1970
Rosencrantz and Guildenstern are Dead, Octagon Theatre, Crawley, WA, 18 September 1969
War and Peace, New Theatre, Darlinghurst, NSW, 21 September 1968
The Royal Hunt of the Sun, Bonython Hall, The University of Adelaide, SA, 14 March 1966
Victimes du Devoir, Union Theatre, Parkville, VIC, 5 September 1964
Romeo and Juliet, Union Theatre, Camperdown, NSW, 18 April 1963
The Dumb Waiter & A Slight Ache, Union Theatre, Camperdown, NSW, 5 July 1962
Coriolanus, Union Theatre, Camperdown, NSW, 4 April 1962
'Tis Pity She's a Whore, Wallace Theatre, Camperdown, NSW, 23 June 1961

Filmography
Arthur Dignam's films include:

Lend Me Your Stable (1962)
Libido (1973) - Father Burn (segment "Priest, The")
Petersen (1974) - Prof. Charles Kent
Between Wars (1974) - Peter Avante
The Devil's Playground (1976) - Brother Francine
Summer of Secrets (1976) - Doctor Beverley Adams
The Duellists (1977) - Captain with Eyepatch
The Chant of Jimmie Blacksmith (1978) - Man in Butcher Shop
Cathy's Child (1979) - Minister
Grendel Grendel Grendel (1981) - The Dragon / Beowulf (voice)
Strange Behavior (1981) - Dr. Le Sange / Nagel
Duet for Four (1982) - Doug Quincey
We of the Never Never (1982) - Aeneas Gunn
The Dismissal (1983, TV Mini-Series) - Eric Robinson
The Return of Captain Invincible (1983) - Lawyer
The Wild Duck (1983) - Gregory
The Schippan Mystery (1984) - Sir Josiah Symon
Burke & Wills (1985) - Sir William Stawell
Comrades (1986) - Fop
The Right Hand Man (1987) - Dr. Redbridge
Those Dear Departed (1987) - Producer
The Everlasting Secret Family (1988) - The Senator
The Dreaming (1988) - Professor Bernard Thornton
Shadow of the Cobra (1989, TV Mini-Series) - Gupta
Edens Lost (1989, TV Movie) - Heath
Isabelle Eberhardt (1991) - Cauvet
The Nostradamus Kid (1993) - Pastor Anderson
Dating the Enemy (1996) - Dr. Kamins
Paradise Road (1997) - Mr. Pike
Oscar and Lucinda (1997)
Gods and Monsters (1998) - Ernest Thesiger (uncredited)
Moulin Rouge! (2001) - Christian's Father
Beneath Clouds (2002) - Old Man in pub / Mercedes driver
The Libertine (2006, Short) - Man
Australia (2008) - Father Benedict
The Tree (2010) - Uncle Jack
The Great Gatsby (2013) - (uncredited)

References

1939 births
2020 deaths
Australian male film actors
Australian male stage actors
Australian male television actors
People from Lord Howe Island
People educated at Newington College
20th-century Australian male actors
21st-century Australian male actors